Peeratat Phoruendee (Thai พีรทรรศ์ โพธิ์เรือนดี) is a Thai retired football player. He is a defender who scored one goal for the national team.

He played for BEC Tero Sasana F.C. in the ASEAN Club Championship 2003, where the club finished runners-up.

International goals

References 

1979 births
Living people
Peeratat Phoruendee
Peeratat Phoruendee
Peeratat Phoruendee
Peeratat Phoruendee
Peeratat Phoruendee
Peeratat Phoruendee
Peeratat Phoruendee
Peeratat Phoruendee
Peeratat Phoruendee
Peeratat Phoruendee
Peeratat Phoruendee
2004 AFC Asian Cup players
Footballers at the 2002 Asian Games
Association football defenders
Peeratat Phoruendee